Mason Lewis O'Malley (born 8 June 2001) is a footballer who plays as a left-back for Ilkeston Town on loan from Scunthorpe United. Born in England, he represents the Republic of Ireland internationally.

Club career
Born in Leeds, O'Malley signed for the academy of Huddersfield Town from Hunslet Boys at under-14 level. He was released by Huddersfield Town in summer 2019, and signed for Scunthorpe United's under-23 squad in July 2019.
O'Malley made his professional debut with Scunthorpe United in a 1-1 (4-2) EFL Trophy penalty shootout loss to Lincoln City on 8 September 2020. He signed a contract extension in December 2020, keeping him at the club until summer 2023.

In February 2023, O'Malley signed for Ilkeston Town on an initial one-month loan deal alongside teammate Jordan Hallam.

International career
O'Malley is of Irish descent, and trained with the Ireland U16s in 2016.

O'Malley made his Republic Of Ireland U21s debut  in a friendly vs. Wales U21s on 26 March 2021.

Career statistics

References

2001 births
Living people
Footballers from Leeds
Republic of Ireland association footballers
Republic of Ireland youth international footballers
English footballers
English people of Irish descent
Association football fullbacks
Scunthorpe United F.C. players
Ilkeston Town F.C. players
English Football League players
National League (English football) players